Green Lantern: Mosaic was an American comic book series published by DC Comics starring the fictional character superhero (John Stewart), a member of the intergalactic police force, the Green Lantern Corps. The series had its origin in a story arc of the same name in Green Lantern (vol. 3) #14–17, and was set up in earlier issues since that series' launch in 1990.

The ongoing series began in June of 1992 and ended in November of 1993, lasting 18 issues. It was written by Gerard Jones and primarily drawn by Cully Hamner.

Plot synopsis
Green Lantern Hal Jordan, investigating the disappearance of Evergreen City on Earth, discovers that Appa Ali Apsa, the lone remaining Guardian left behind after his brothers left our dimension, has been driven insane by loneliness. For companionship, Apsa has been uprooting cities from all the worlds he has visited and transporting them to the planet Oa, creating a patchwork known as the Mosaic World.

John Stewart, captured by Apsa, summons Jordan through their power rings and, together with Guy Gardner and the newly returned Guardians, defeat Apsa.

Believing that Apsa's experiment should be allowed to progress to its conclusion, the Guardians elected to maintain his strange mosaic of communities rather than return the inhabitants to their homeworlds. Accordingly, the Guardians assigned Stewart to act as the Green Lantern of the Mosaic world. Stewart was charged with maintaining the peace among the different communities as well as attempting to construct a cohesive society from the disparate races.

Initially distrustful of each other, the various communities sometimes came to battle, even leading to fatalities. Some of the cities had life-forms hostile to each other or to all other life. Stewart also dealt with less fatal problems, such as overpopulation and the fact one of the cities was inhabited by only two people. Assisting Stewart in his efforts are some of the citizens of Evergreen City, including several youngsters whose parents are suffering severe mental problems due to their unique situation. John gives these children less-powerful rings and they assist in future conflicts. John also tries to build roads between the cities. This, along with his other efforts, are hampered by visions of 'the red', which seem to be manifestations of Sinestro. During one of these vision flares, the Green Lantern known as Ch'p is struck and killed by a yellow truck on one of the connecting roads.

Not all the cities were dangerous. The 'Trendoids' were entities who avoided conflict by impersonating any visitors.

Through John's efforts, the cities of Mosaic World were eventually forged into a cohesive society. In return for his success, the Guardians granted Stewart the honor of becoming the first mortal Guardian.

Hal Jordan, possessed by the Parallax entity, destroyed the Central Power Battery and slew all but one of the Guardians of the Universe, leaving Oa and the Mosaic a barren wasteland.

Later it was revealed that The Mosaic World was evacuated by a multi-species coalition in anticipation of the battle between the corrupted Hal Jordan/Parallax and the Guardians. The survivors of the experiments were carried back to their homeworld.

Mosaic's abandoned remains were finally destroyed when Oa was obliterated by Kyle Rayner during a battle with Jordan.

Cancellation
In an unusual move, and although sales of the book were very strong, Green Lantern: Mosaic was cancelled early into its run. In an interview, Cully Hamner revealed the reasons behind the cancellation:
(A)s I was told at the time, it didn't fit with DC editorial vision (whatever that means). Sales didn't matter, fan support didn't matter; the first issue sold about 210,000 copies and my last issue sold about 70,000, so there was plenty of support for the book. It was marked for cancellation when issue #5 came out, and they allowed Gerry Jones a year to wrap it up, but there was no doubt that it was being cancelled because somebody upstairs just didn't care for it. So, I had a feeling after a while of creatively being against a brick wall, and got out before the end. You pay your money, you takes your chances. That's the biz.

Notes

References

External links
 Article on Green Lantern: Mosaic
 Fanzing interview with Gerard Jones 

1992 comics debuts
Alien abduction in popular culture